St Leonard's College may refer to:

 St Leonard's College (University of St Andrews)
 St Leonard's College (Melbourne)